Catherine Chelsea Rampell (born November 4, 1984) is an American opinion journalist and nationally syndicated opinion columnist.

Early life and education
Rampell grew up in a Jewish family in South Florida, the daughter of Ellen (née Kahn), an accountant, and Richard Rampell.

Rampell graduated Phi Beta Kappa from Princeton University with an A.B. in anthropology in 2007 after completing a 150-page-long senior thesis, titled "Hawk the Vote: Marketing Voting to American Youth", under the supervision of James A. Boon.

Both of her parents are Princeton alumni.

Career
Rampell is an opinion columnist for The Washington Post and a member of The Washington Post Writers Group. She also is a CNN & PBS NewsHour Political Commentator.  Prior to joining The Washington Post, Rampell was an economics journalist, theater critic, and blogger for The New York Times.

Personal life
In 2014, she married Christopher Conlon.

References

External links
 
 

1984 births
21st-century American journalists
21st-century American women writers
American agnostics
American columnists
American economics writers
Jewish agnostics
Jewish American journalists
Living people
The New York Times writers
Princeton University alumni
The Washington Post journalists
American women columnists
Journalists from Florida